River Songs is the third full length studio album by American band The Badlees. It was released on their independent label, Rite-Off Records, in February 1995 and sold over 10,000 units before being picked up by the national label Polydor/Atlas after the band signed with that label later in 1995. The album was re-released nationally with no further production enhancement in October 1995 and went on the spawn three national hits - "Fear of Falling", "Angeline Is Coming Home", and "Gwendolyn".

Background
After returning home from China in August 1994, where The Badlees played the Qingdao International Beer Festival, the band headed back to the studio to start on another album. They planned on calling this next one simply "The Badlees", as a symbol of their commitment to hit the "reset" button and return to their roots musically, but soon found a more fitting title that would become familiar to music fans nationwide.

The band made daily commutes from their base in Selinsgrove to The Green Room, a studio in Harrisburg, Pennsylvania, to record their third full-length album. This 50 mile journey in each direction follows the Susquehanna River as it winds through rural central Pennsylvania towards the mini metropolis of the commonwealth’s capital city. The new album would ultimately become River Songs, and would be the catalyst that finally propelled the Badlees into the national spotlight.

Upon its release by Rite-Off Records on February 28, 1995, River Songs was instantly recognized by many as something quite special. Writer Alan Stout of The Wilkes-Barre Times Leader observed "it's somewhat ironic that an album this good is an independent release, and there's almost a feeling of guilt in enjoying it all to ourselves here in the confines of Pennsylvania." No one was more astutely aware of this than manager Terry Selders, who had already identified "Fear of Falling" as the song that would be the band's breakthrough to national fame, but wanted to issue another single first to introduce the new album and build up to the eventual push of "Fear of Falling". He ultimately chose "Angeline Is Coming Home" or "Gwendolyn" and within weeks the song was in regular rotation on radio stations throughout eastern Pennsylvania.

Track listing 
Note - the order listed below is from the original Rite-Off Records release of February, 1995.

Personnel
 Pete Palladino – Vocals, Harmonica, Kazoo
 Bret Alexander – Guitar, Mandolin, Dobro, Dulcimer, Harmonica, Jaw Harp, Vocals
 Jeff Feltenberger – Acoustic Guitar, Vocals
 Paul Smith – Bass, Keyboards, Vocals
 Ron Simasek – Drums, Percussion, Stumpf Fiddle

Additional musicians
 Robert Scott Richardson - Hammond B-3 Organ

Production
 Gary Greyhosky, Bret Alexander, Paul Smith, Jeff Feltenberger - Engineers at The Green Room
 Joe Alexander & Brad Catlett - Engineers at Kajem Studios
 Scott Hull - Engineer at Masterdisk
 Janice Radocha - Photos
 Donna Glass and Pete Palladino - Layout and design
 Terry Selders - Personal manager
 Scott Berger - Road manager
 Keith Barshinger - Live sound engineer
 Mike Naydock - Songwriting collaborator

References
Modern Rock Review Badlees Profile, October 10, 2010
The Badlees Archives by Alan K. Stout
"Badlees Back from Abroad in Studio" by Dave Donati, Sound Check, Issue 3 Vol.2, October 1994
"Small Town Band Headed to Big Time" by Jennifer Huff, Panorama Magazine, Vol.14 #10 (p. 51), October 1994
"Take a Cruise on Badlees’ New 'River' " by Alan K. Stout, Wilkes-Barre Times Leader, February 28, 1995

1995 albums
The Badlees albums